Verkhneye Gutorovo is a rural locality in Polevskoy Selsoviet Rural Settlement, Kursky District, Kursk Oblast, Russia. Population:

Geography 
The village is located on the Seym River (a left tributary of the Desna), 101 km from the Russia–Ukraine border, 26 km south-east of the district center – the town Kursk, 4 km from the selsoviet center – Polevaya.

 Streets
There are the following streets in the locality: Lugovaya, Naberezhnaya, Shkolnaya and Tsentralnaya (306 houses).

 Climate
Verkhneye Gutorovo has a warm-summer humid continental climate (Dfb in the Köppen climate classification).

Transport 
Verkhneye Gutorovo is located 9.5 km from the federal route  (Kursk – Voronezh –  "Kaspy" Highway; a part of the European route ), 4.5 km from the road of regional importance  (R-298 – Polevaya), on the road of intermunicipal significance  (38K-014 – Verkhneye Gutorovo), in the vicinity of the railway halt Gutorovo (railway line Klyukva — Belgorod).

The rural locality is situated 27 km from Kursk Vostochny Airport, 105 km from Belgorod International Airport and 186 km from Voronezh Peter the Great Airport.

References

Notes

Sources

Rural localities in Kursky District, Kursk Oblast